Geliguran (also Romanized as Gelīgūrān; also known as Golī Kūrān, Gūrān, Kolī Gūrān, Kolī Gūrūn, and Kooran) is a village in Dashtab Rural District, in the Central District of Baft County, Kerman Province, Iran. At the 2006 census, its population was 119, in 21 families.

References 

Populated places in Baft County